The Cathedral of our Lady of Sorrows, also called Cathedral of Mary Mother of Sorrows, Chaldean Catholic cathedral located in Baghdad, Iraq, dedicated to Our Lady of Sorrows. Consecrated in 1898, it is the seat of the Chaldean Catholic Patriarchate of Babylon of the Chaldean Catholic Church, an Eastern Catholic particular church sui iuris in full communion with the Holy See in Rome, and the rest of the worldwide Catholic Church.

References

External links

Chaldean Catholic cathedrals
Eastern Catholic cathedrals in Iraq
Churches in Baghdad